MK5 may refer to:

Mortal Kombat: Deadly Alliance, the fifth game in the Mortal Kombat series
Mario Kart DS, the fifth game in the Mario Kart series, released in 2005 for the Nintendo DS
MK5, an English postcode district
British Rail Mark 5 (CAF), a rolling stock designation in the United Kingdom
British Rail Mark 5A, a similar development of rolling stock in the United Kingdom